Charles Bianconi (24 September 1786 – 22 September 1875) was an Italo-Irish entrepreneur. Sometimes described as the "man who put Ireland on wheels", he developed a network of horse-drawn coaches that became Ireland's "first regular public transport" system. He eventually became known for his innovations in transport and was twice mayor of Clonmel, in County Tipperary.

Early life
Born Carlo Bianconi in Costa Masnaga, Italy on 24 September 1786, he moved from an area poised to fall to Napoleon and travelled to Ireland in 1802, via England, just four years after the 1798 rebellion. At the time, British fear of continental invasion resulted in an acute sense of insecurity and additional restrictions on the admission of foreigners. He was christened Carlo but anglicised his name to Charles when he arrived in Ireland in 1802.

Career

He worked as an engraver and printseller in Dublin, near Essex Street, under his sponsor, Andrea Faroni, when he was 16. In 1806 he set up an engraving, gilding and print shop in Carrick-on-Suir, moving to Clonmel in 1815.

Although widely regarded as the founder of public transportation in Ireland, he built on the system of mail coaches and roads that were built around Ireland before 1790 by the Scottish entrepreneur, John Anderson of Fermoy. After the collapse of Anderson's mail coach and banking empire in 1815, Bianconi established regular horse-drawn carriage services on various routes from about 1815 onwards. He acknowledged two advantages that led to his success: 

The first service, Clonmel to Cahir, took five to eight hours by boat but only two hours by Bianconi’s carriage. Travel on a ‘Bian’ cost one penny farthing a mile. His open 'Bianconi coaches' colloquially shortened to 'Bians', were a popular form of public transport for over a century. 

There were also a series of inns, the Bianconi Inns, some of which still exist; in Piltown, County Kilkenny and Killorglin, County Kerry. These services continued into the 1850s and later, by which time there were a number of railway services in the country. The Bianconi coaches continued to be well-patronised, by offering connections from various termini, one of the first and few examples of an integrated transport system in Ireland. By 1865 Bianconi’s annual income was about £35,000.

Later life and death
Bianconi died on 22 September 1875 at Longfield House, Boherlahan, County Tipperary.

Having donated land to the parish of Boherlahan for the construction of a parish church, Bianconi wished to be buried on the church grounds. He, and his family, are buried in a side chapel, separate from the parish church in Boherlahan, approximately 5 miles from Cashel, County Tipperary.

Family
In 1832 Bianconi married Eliza Hayes, the daughter of a wealthy Dublin stockbroker. They had three children - Charles Thomas Bianconi, Catherine Henrietta Bianconi and Mary Anne Bianconi the wife of Morgan John O'Connell and mother of John O'Connell Bianconi. Mary Anne published a biography of her father in 1878 which featured contributions by the artist Michael Angelo Haynes and the writer Anthony Trollope, who both knew him.

References

Notes

Sources

External links

 Bianconi bio and photos of his native town
 Timetable 'Bianconi's Royal Mail Day Cars' from Leigh's New Pocket Road-book of Ireland, 1835.

1786 births
1875 deaths
Italian emigrants to Ireland
19th-century Irish businesspeople
Transport in County Tipperary
People from Clonmel
Mayors of places in the Republic of Ireland
People of Lombard descent